"Another Love" is a song by English singer-songwriter Tom Odell, released in October 2012 as his debut single and lifted from his debut extended play, Songs from Another Love (2012) as well as the lead single from his debut studio album Long Way Down (2013).

In 2013, the song became a major commercial success in Europe, peaking at number 10 on the UK Singles Chart, and becoming Odell's first top-ten hit in that country. It also experienced success in the Netherlands, Austria, and Belgium.

In 2022, the song re-appeared on charts across Europe and Australia after becoming popular on TikTok, eventually returning to its number 10 UK Singles Chart position in January 2023. In August 2022, the song amassed 1 billion streams on Spotify.

Music video
A music video to accompany the release of "Another Love" was first released onto YouTube on 5 November 2012 at a total length of four minutes and eight seconds. It depicts Odell sitting in an armchair in front of the camera as a girl attempts to get his attention. It ends with the girl seemingly leaving Odell.

Another video has been released, called the "short film" version, for the song's American release. It shows Odell walking the streets and showing missing person notices for a woman he does not recognize when he finally comes across her. The video features actress Sarah Navratil.

Critical reception

Writing for Digital Spy, Lewis Corner stated that the song "is mourning at its most hauntingly beautiful".

Adaptations
"Another Love" was adapted by the Hungarian alternative rock band Zaporozsec under the title "Azon az éjszakán" and became a number-one hit on Petőfi Rádió's Top 30 for three weeks. A music video was released onto YouTube on 2 February 2016.

Charts

Weekly charts

Year-end charts

Certifications

References

Tom Odell songs
2012 songs
2013 singles
Songs written by Tom Odell
Ultratop 50 Singles (Flanders) number-one singles
Columbia Records singles